The Love Album is an album compiled from tracks recorded by Doris Day during three studio sessions arranged and conducted by Sid Feller in Hollywood in 1967, but not released until 1994.

In 2006, the album was reissued in CD form, with extra tracks taken from a Doris Day television special recorded in 1971.

Track listing
"For All We Know" (J. Fred Coots, Sam M. Lewis)
"Snuggled On Your Shoulder" (Carmen Lombardo, Joe Young)
"Are You Lonesome Tonight" (Lou Handman, Roy Turk)
"Wonderful One" (Ferde Grofé, Paul Whiteman, Theodora Morse)
"Street of Dreams" (Victor Young, Sam M. Lewis)
"Oh How I Miss You Tonight" (Joe Burke, Mark Fisher, Benny Davis)
"Life Is Just a Bowl of Cherries" (Ray Henderson, Buddy G. DeSylva, Lew Brown)
"All Alone" (Irving Berlin)
"Faded Summer Love" (Phil Baxter)
"Sleepy Lagoon" (Eric Coates, Jack Lawrence)
"If I Had My Life to Live Over" (Larry Vincent, Henry Tobias, Moe Jaffe) 
"Let Me Call You Sweetheart" (Leo Friedman, Beth Slater Whitson)
Bonus tracks
"Both Sides Now"
"It's Magic"
"Sentimental Journey”

References

1994 albums
Concord Records albums
Doris Day albums
Albums arranged by Sid Feller
Albums conducted by Sid Feller